Northern Voice was an annual blogging, social software and online communities conference held in Vancouver, British Columbia, Canada from 2005 to 2013. The conference was organized by members of the Vancouver blogging community, who attempted to keep the event accessible to as many people as possible. Keynote speakers at Northern Voice included Anil Dash (then of Six Apart), Matt Mullenweg of WordPress, Nora Young of CBC Radio, Chris Messina, April Smith and Chris Wilson.

Northern Voice events:
 Northern Voice 2005 - February 19, 2005
 Northern Voice 2006 - February 11 and 12, 2006
 Northern Voice 2007 - February 23 and 24, 2007
 Northern Voice 2008 - February 22 and 23, 2008
 Northern Voice 2009 - February 20 and 21, 2009
 Northern Voice 2010 - May 7 and 8, 2010
 Northern Voice 2011 - May 13 and 14, 2011
 Northern Voice 2012 - June 15 and 16, 2012
 Northern Voice 2013 - June 14 and 15, 2013

About Northern Voice 
The idea for a Canadian blogging conference was first mentioned on Darren Barefoot's blog in March 2004. 

Conference organizers included Darren Barefoot, Kris Krug, Brian Lamb, Cyprien Lomas, Boris Mann, James Sherret, Travis Smith, Julie Szabo, Roland Tanglao, Lauren Wood, Dale McGladdery, Shane Birley, Allyson McGrane, and Jonathon Narvey.

Northern Voice started as a one-day event, held on Saturdays. In 2007, a second day was added, for an unconference known as Moose Camp.

Discussion topics included "how blogging interacts with family life, education, travel, photography, community building and establishing professional profiles."

References
 “Companies take online journals to heart”, Vancouver Sun, Feb. 18, 2005 (behind a subscription wall)
 “The Blogosphere’s New World Disorder”, The Tyee, Feb. 21, 2005
 CBC Morning Show Interview, Feb. 18 (MP3)

External links
northernvoice.ca

Web-related conferences
Recurring events established in 2005
Recurring events disestablished in 2013
2005 establishments in British Columbia